Shilin (formerly transliterated as Shihlin Station until 2003) is a metro station in Taipei, Taiwan served by Taipei Metro. It is a station on the Tamsui-Xinyi Line. The station was formerly a stop on the now-defunct TRA Tamsui Line.

Station overview
The station is situated between the metro-shaped park and Zhongzheng Road, near Zhongshan North Road and Wenlin Road. The two-level, elevated station structure with one island platform and two exits, going to Zhongzheng Road and Fude Road. The restrooms are inside the entrance area of both exits.

In the future, the station will allow transfers to the planned Circular Line via an underground platform.

History
Shilin station was opened on 25 October 1901 for the TRA. It was closed on 15 July 1988, for the construction of Taipei Metro, which has been completed on 28 March 1997.

Station layout

First and Last Train Timing 
The first and last train timing at Shilin station  is as follows:

Gallery

References

Tamsui–Xinyi line stations
Railway stations opened in 1901
Railway stations closed in 1988
Railway stations opened in 1997